Nanpinggang is a subdistrict and the seat of Wuling District in Changde Prefecture-level City, Hunan, China. On August 18, 2014, the former Nanpinggang Township was reorganized as a subdistrict. It has 4 communities and 3 villages under its jurisdiction, its seat is Wangyue Community.

See also 
 List of township-level divisions of Hunan

References

Wuling District
Subdistricts of Hunan
County seats in Hunan